Cinekambiya International Film Festival (CIFF) is an annual film festival held in The Gambia. The festival was founded by Prince Bubacarr Aminata Sankanu in 2015 and has since had three editions. It is supported by German cultural organisation FilmInitiativ Köln.

History 
Cinekambiya International Film Festival was founded in 2015 as a festival for films made in indigenous languages not always considered in more mainstream festivals in the West. As many African filmmakers cannot afford to visit festivals on other continents, CIFF was designed to provide an alternative for them to expose their works to domestic and international audiences. The festival is organised by Sanxaari, the production company of Prince Bubacarr Aminata Sankanu.

The first edition of the festival took place from 26 December 2015 to 3 January 2016. The grand patron of this inaugural edition was Isatou Touray, and the theme was "African Cinema and Gender Valuation". It took place in the Global Hands Development Hub, Manduar, West Coast Region. Following this edition, FilmInitiativ Köln, a German cultural organisation focused on African cinema, pledged its support to future editions of the festival.

The second edition of the festival had the theme "The Youth Factor", and was also the inaugural festival for the Pan African Screen Awards (PASA). It took place from 20 May 2016 to 26 May 2016. The third edition of the festival had the theme "Film and the Rights to Truth in Transitional Justice" and took place on 25 December 2017 to 30 December 2017. The third edition was opened by a screening of Sankanu's production, Bleeding Blade. Over 20 Gambian-made films were screened during the festival, as well as productions from Togo, Germany, and Iraq.

Editions

Pan African Screen Awards 
The Pan African Screen Awards (PASA) were founded in 2008 by Sankanu, and the ceremony took place for the first time during the 2008 Out of Africa Film Festival in Germany. France-based Nigerian director Newton Aduaka won the main prize for his 2007 film Ezra on the Sierra Leone Civil War. In 2016, the awards were attached to CIFF as a result of Sankanu's involvement in both. In 2016, PASA had 17 categories. They were as follows:

 Best Male Actor
 Best Female Actor
 Best Comedian, Stage and Screen
 Best Director
 Best Cinematographer
 Best Scriptwriter/Playwright
 Best Feature Film
 Best Documentary
 Best Creative Group
 Best Production/Post Production Services
 Best Institutional Patron of the Arts
 Best Patron of the Arts
 Best Medium for Arts, Culture and Entertainment
 Best Reporter/Writer on Arts, Culture and Entertainment
 Best Television Content
 Best Celebrity Humanitarian Action
 Life Achievement Award

References 

Film festivals in Africa
Film festivals established in 2015
International film awards
Cinema of the Gambia
2015 establishments in the Gambia